Molybdenum(II) acetate is a coordination compound with the formula Mo2(O2CCH3)4. It is a yellow, diamagnetic, air-stable solid that is slightly soluble in organic solvents. Molybdenum(II) acetate is an iconic example of a compound with a metal-metal quadruple bond.

Structure and bonding
Like several other transition metal carboxylate complexes, Mo2(O2CCH3)4  adopts a Chinese lantern structure.  Each Mo(II) center in Mo2(O2CCH3)4 has four d valence electrons. These eight d-electrons form one σ, two π bonds, and one δ bond, creating a bonding electron configuration of σ2π4δ2. Each of these bonds are formed by the overlapping of pairs of d orbitals. The four acetate groups bridge the two metal centers.  The Mo-O bond between each Mo(II) center and O atom from acetate has a distance of 2.119 Å, and the Mo-Mo distance between the two metal centers is 2.0934 Å.

Preparation
Mo2(O2CCH3)4 is prepared by treating molybdenum hexacarbonyl (Mo(CO)6) with acetic acid. The process strips CO ligands from the hexacarbonyl and results in the oxidation of Mo(0) to Mo(II).

2 Mo(CO)6 + 4 HO2CCH3   →   Mo2(O2CCH3)4  +  12 CO  +  2 H2
Trinuclear clusters are byproducts.

The reaction of HO2CCH3 and Mo(CO)6 was first investigated by Bannister et al. in 1960. At the time, quadruple metal-metal bonds had not yet been discovered, so these authors proposed that Mo(O2CCH3)2 was tetrahedral. This perspective changed with Mason's characterization.

Applications
Mo2(O2CCH3)4 is generally used as an intermediate compound in a process to form other quadruply bonded molybdenum compounds. The acetate ligands can be replaced to give new compounds such as [Mo2Cl8]4− and Mo2Cl4[P(C4H9)3]4.

References

Acetates
Molybdenum(II) compounds